The Canterbury cap is a square cloth hat with sharp corners. It originated in the Middle Ages, and is commonly found in the Anglican Communion, as well as in the Catholic Church where it is used by Anglican Ordinariate clergy. It is also soft and foldable, "Constructed to fold flat when not in use ..." The Canterbury cap is the medieval biretta, descended from the ancient pileus headcovering. It is sometimes called the "catercap".

In Anglican churches, clergy are entitled to wear the cap, which is worn for processions and when seated to listen to Scripture or to give a homily, but not when at the Holy Table. It forms part of the "canonical" outdoor clerical dress, along with cassock, gown, and tippet. The cap is made of black velvet for bishops and doctors, otherwise of black wool.

In 1899, Percy Dearmer wrote in The Parson's Handbook:

A similar cap called the Oxford soft cap is worn today as part of academic dress by some women undergraduates at the University of Oxford instead of the mortarboard. It has a flap at the back which is held up with buttons unlike the Canterbury cap.

The Tudor bonnet is also a similar academic cap worn by a person who holds a doctorate.

The Canterbury cap differs from the present-day biretta, as a Canterbury cap has four ridges, compared to the biretta's three. In addition, the biretta is (sometimes) rigid, or rigid but folding, while the Canterbury cap is always soft and easily folds when not in use. In the Catholic Church, its use is identical to that of the modern biretta, into which, on the continent, the cap evolved into throughout the centuries.

Gallery

See also 

 The Philippi Collection

References

External links 
 

Anglican vestments
Hats